Statistics of the Scottish Football League in season 1894–95.

Overview
Hearts won the Scottish Division One.

Hibernian topped the Scottish Division Two for the second successive year. Renton failed to show for their fixture at Dundee Wanderers, hence only 17 games played for both clubs. Dundee Wanderers were awarded the two points for the game.

Scottish League Division One

Scottish League Division Two

See also
1894–95 in Scottish football

References

 
1894-95